The Lyric Theatre was a Broadway theatre built in 1903 in the Theater District of Manhattan in New York City.  It had two formal entrances: at 213 West 42nd Street and 214-26 West 43rd Street. In 1934, it was converted into a movie theatre which it remained until closing in 1992. In 1996, its interior was demolished and the space was combined with that of the former Apollo Theatre to create the Ford Center, now the new Lyric Theatre. Both the 42nd and 43rd Street facades of the original Lyric were preserved and today form the front and back entrances of the modern Lyric Theatre.

History
The theatre was originally built by developer Eugene C. Potter as a home for composer Reginald De Koven's American School of Opera. However, the school went bankrupt before construction was finished, and Potter leased the theatre and its offices to the Shubert brothers. It was designed by architect Victor Hugo Koehler, and opened on October 12, 1903, with Richard Mansfield's production of Old Heidelberg.

The Lyric originally had approximately 1,350 seats and two balconies. It had eighteen box seats, nine on each side of the auditorium. These were considered far too many for a commercial theatre of its size, and six, the top row of each side, were removed soon after the Lyric opened.

The busts shown on the 2nd floor of the facade are of W. S. Gilbert, Arthur Sullivan and Reginald De Koven.

Notable shows

The Lyric Theatre hosted many notable shows in the early decades of the 20th century. Many plays by William Shakespeare were produced, sometimes multiple times, the most popular being The Merchant of Venice, which was first produced in 1904 and revived three times in 1907. Both Hamlet and Othello were produced three times between 1907 and 1914. Other Shakespearean classics included The Taming of the Shrew, The Twelfth Night, Romeo and Juliet, King Lear, Macbeth and Julius Caesar.

Sarah Bernhardt appeared at the Lyric in 1906. In 1918, Sigmund Romberg's popular operetta Maytime was produced. In 1925, the Marx Brothers appeared in one of their earliest Broadway shows, The Cocoanuts, which in 1929 was adapted into an early sound film, the  brothers' first feature film.

Florenz Ziegfeld produced at least three shows there, including Rio Rita in 1927 and The Three Musketeers in 1928.

Cole Porter's musical Fifty Million Frenchmen opened in 1929.

References
Notes

External links

Lyric Theatre at Internet Broadway Database, with historic photographs
Lyric Theatre at the New 42nd Street

Former Broadway theatres
Demolished theatres in New York City
Demolished buildings and structures in Manhattan
Former theatres in Manhattan
42nd Street (Manhattan)
1903 establishments in New York City
1992 disestablishments in New York (state)
Theatres completed in 1903